Mojtame-ye Meskuni Khaneh Darya (also Romanized as Mojtame`-ye Meskūnī Khāneh Daryā) is a village in Harazpey-ye Shomali Rural District, Sorkhrud District, Mahmudabad County, Mazandaran Province, Iran. At the 2006 census, its population was 18, in 6 families.

References 

Populated places in Mahmudabad County